Conizonia fausti is a species of beetle in the family Cerambycidae. It was described by Ganglbauer in 1885, originally under the genus Phytoecia. It is known from Iran.

References

Saperdini
Beetles described in 1885